Boiga cynodon, commonly known as the dog-toothed cat snake, is a nocturnal species of rear-fanged colubrid snake endemic to Asia.

Description
The front teeth of the upper jaw and the lower jaw are strongly enlarged.

The body is slender and laterally compressed. Dorsally it is tannish with reddish-brown or dark brown crossbands. There is a dark streak behind the eye on each side of the head. The venter is whitish, heavily marbled with dark brown.

The smooth dorsal scales are arranged in 23 or 33 rows at midbody, and those in the vertebral row are strongly enlarged. Ventrals 248–290; subcaudals 114–165.

Diet
It feeds mainly upon small birds and bird eggs, but may also take lizards and small Bats.

Reproduction
Boiga cynodon is an oviparous species, with sexually mature females laying eggs, 6-12 per clutch.

Geographic range
Indonesia (Bali, Bangka, Belitung, Borneo, Flores, Java, Kalimantan, Mentawai Archipelago, Nias, Riau Archipelago, Sumatra, Sumbawa)
Malaysia (Malaya and East Malaysia), Pulau Tioman 
Philippine Islands (Basilan, Culion, Dinagat, Leyte, Luzon, Mindanao, Bohol,  Palawan, Panay, Polillo, Samar, 
Sibutu, Sulu Archipelago)
Singapore
Thailand

References

Further reading
 Boie, F. 1827. Bemerkungen über Merrem's Versuch eines Systems der Amphibien, 1. Lieferung: Ophidier. Isis van Oken, Jena, 20: 508–566.
 Bulian, J. 2005. Boiga cynodon - die Grüne Nachtbaumnatter. Reptilia (Münster) 10 (1): 70–77.

cynodon
Reptiles of the Philippines
Taxa named by Friedrich Boie
Reptiles described in 1827
Reptiles of Borneo